KBDY (102.1 FM) is a radio station licensed to Hanna, Wyoming, United States. The station is owned by Toga Radio LLC.

The station's transmitter is located atop Elk Mountain.

History
The station signed on the air as KXMP, beginning on November 9, 2006. On July 7, 2008, the station changed its call sign to  KBDY.

References

External links

BDY
Radio stations established in 2006
Country radio stations in the United States